Bertel Johan Sebastian, Baron Gripenberg, born 19 September 1878 in Saint Petersburg, died 6 May 1947, was a Finland-Swedish poet. He was nominated for the Nobel prize in literature fourteen times.

Career 
His early poetry was inspired by fin de siècle eroticism, which was followed by an interest in ethics in the poetry published between 1908 and 1917. After that came a more militaristic and political period, in collections such as Under fanan (1918), Efter striden (1925) and Den stora tiden (1928). In a fourth and last period Gripenberg's poetry became more introspective.

Gripenberg's 1925 poetry collection Den hemliga glöden, published under the pseudonym Åke Erikson, is a parody of modernist poetry. He also translated English and Finnish works into Swedish. Among his more prominent translations are Johannes Linnankoski's novel The Song of the Blood-Red Flower and Edgar Lee Masters' Spoon River Anthology.

From an early age Gripenberg had a disdain for egalitarian thought and parliamentary democracy, and participated on the White side in the Finnish Civil War. His 1918 poem "Den drömda armén" ("the dreamed army") has been interpreted as a prediction of the Winter War. He joined the Lapua Movement but looked down on the Fascist and National Socialist movements which he found to be plebeian. Regardless he enthusiastically supported Germany in the Second World War. He participated in the Peasant March to Helsinki in the summer of 1930, but after that rarely took part in any public political activity.

Selected works

Poetry
1903 – Dikter
1904 – Vida vägar
1905 – Gallergrinden
1907 – Rosenstaden
1908 – Svarta sonetter
1909 – Drifsnö
1911 – Aftnar i Tavastland
1918 – Under fanan
1922 – Kanonernas röst
1923 – Efter striden
1925 – Den hemliga glöden (under the pseudonym Åke Erikson)
1925 – Skymmande land
1928 – Den stora tiden
1930 – Vid gränsen
1933 – Livets eko
1941 – Sista ronden
1947 – Genom gallergrinden (posthumous)

Prose and drama
1909 – Vid mörkrets portar
1910 – Det brinnande landet
1918 – En dröm om folkviljan
1925 – På Dianas vägar

Accolades
1913 – Tollanderska priset
1916 – De Nios Stora Pris
1930 – De Nios Stora Pris
1940 – De Nios Stora Pris

References

1878 births
1947 deaths
Barons of Sweden
English–Swedish translators
Finnish poets in Swedish
People of the Finnish Civil War (White side)
Translators from Finnish
Writers from Saint Petersburg
Finnish emigrants to Sweden